P. brownii  may refer to:
 Paeonia brownii, the Brown's peony or native peony, a herbaceous perennial flowering plant species native to the western United States
 Parsonsia brownii, the twining silkpod or mountain silkpod, a woody vine species found in New South Wales, Victoria and Tasmania in Australia